Charles Ames Washburn (March 16, 1822 – January 26, 1889), also known as C. A. Washburn, was the U.S. Minister to Paraguay.

He was born in Livermore, Maine. He was the son of Israel Washburn Sr.; nephew of Reuel Washburn; brother of Israel Washburn, Jr., Elihu B. Washburne, Cadwallader C. Washburn  and William D. Washburn. He went to California for the 1849 Gold Rush.

In 1854 in San Francisco, Washburn and Benjamin Franklin Washington fought a duel with rifles at forty paces. Washburn was severely wounded by the second shot fired at him.  Neither died.

A member of the Republican Party, Washburn was later Presidential Elector for California, 1860; U.S. Diplomatic Commissioner to Paraguay, 1861–63; U.S. Minister to Paraguay, 1863–68; novelist; and inventor of an early typewriter.

See also
 United States Ambassador to Paraguay
 Paraguayan War

References

Charles Ames Washburn at the United States Department of State
https://legacy.sfgenealogy.org/sf/history/hbabs2.htm
http://timelines.ws/cities/SF_A_1892.HTML

California Republicans
19th-century American diplomats
American duellists
1822 births
1889 deaths
Washburn family
People from Livermore, Maine
Ambassadors of the United States to Paraguay